The schedule of swimming events at the 2008 Summer Olympics occurred in two segments:
pools events: evening of August 9 through the morning of August 17, at the "Water Cube"
open water events: August 20 and 21 at Shunyi Olympic Rowing-Canoeing Park (held between rowing events on the Olympic Rowing course).

For the pool events, prelims were held in the evening, with semifinals/final in the following morning session, with a day between semifinals and finals in those events with semifinals. The shift of the normal morning preliminary heats and evening finals (to evening prelims and morning finals) occurred for the 2008 Olympics due to a request made by USA's broadcaster NBC, so that the finals from the event could be shown "live" in the USA. (Live ended up being 11:00 p.m.-midnight on the East Coast; with a tape delay to the same time for the West Coast.)

Pool schedule

Open Water schedule

References

Swimming schedule 2008 Olympics website; retrieved 2009-06-02.

Event order